The 2001 International Formula 3000 Championship was the 35th season of the second-tier motorsport feeder championship of Formula One and the 17th season to be held under the series name. It featured the 2001 FIA International Formula 3000 Championship, a one-make motor racing series, recognised by the sport's governing body, the Fédération Internationale de l'Automobile (FIA), as the second highest class of competition of single seater racing cars. A total of 37 drivers representing 13 teams contested 12 races, starting in Brazil on 31 March and ending in Italy on 15 September as they competed for the Drivers' and Teams' Championships.

The calendar featured two significant changes from the 2000 season. They were the inclusion of a season-opening round at the Autódromo José Carlos Pace in Brazil to bring the series to South America for the first time in the modern era and a year-ending race at Italy's Autodromo Nazionale di Monza. Three teams withdrew from the championship before the season: Fortec Motorsport withdrew after they were unable to sign any suitable drivers and desired to focus on other junior series. MySap.com pulled out when owner David Brown left its parent company McLaren to join the Jordan Grand Prix team in Formula One and the World Racing Team withdrew due to a lack of financing and driver stability.

Justin Wilson of the Coca-Cola Nordic Team won three races over the course of the season and secured the Drivers' Championship with one race to go. He became the first British driver in history to win the International Formula 3000 Championship and accumulated a record-breaking 71 points. The runner-up was Super Nova Racing driver Mark Webber, who was 32 points behind Wilson, after a series of accidents eliminated him from title contention in the final third of the season. Wilson's teammate Tomáš Enge in third tied with Webber on championship points with two race victories. Coca-Cola Nordic Team took the Teams' Championship with two rounds remaining, ahead of Petrobras Junior Team and Super Nova Racing.

Teams and drivers

The following teams and drivers were under contract to compete in the 2001 International Formula 3000 Championship. As the championship was a spec series, all competitors raced with a Lola B99/50 chassis with a V8 engine developed by Zytek. Teams competed with tyres supplied by Avon.

Team changes

A total of 30 entries spread across 13 teams were initially entered into the championship with the publication of a drivers' list on 2 December 2000. MySap.com withdrew from the championship after its team principal David Brown left its parent company McLaren and moved to the Jordan team in Formula One. Car owner and former sports car driver Gabriele Rafanelli withdrew the World Racing Team (WRT) from the series to focus on the American Le Mans Series operation, tired of F3000 due to a lack of financing and driver stability. European Formula Racing ended its partnership with the Arrows Formula One team, causing team owner Paul Stoddart to re-brand the team European Minardi F3000. Fortec Motorsport were included on the initial entry list before the team withdrew from the championship because they could not locate any suitable drivers to sign and they wanted to focus on other junior series. Prost Grand Prix changed the name of its team from Gauloises Formula to F3000 Prost Junior Team after they lost sponsorship backing from the tobacco company Gauloises.

Driver changes

The 2001 season saw several driver changes. Defending series champion Bruno Junqueira left the Petrobras Junior Team and moved to Championship Auto Racing Teams (CART) to drive for Chip Ganassi Racing (CGR). His teammate Jaime Melo left the team to join Durango on a one-year contract with the option to extend by another season afterwards, partnering series debutant Gabriele Lancieri, who progressed from the Italian Formula 3000 Championship. Italian series champion Ricardo Sperafico drove the second Petrobras car; his twin brother Rodrigo Sperafico moved from the same championship to join Coloni and partnered Fabrizio Gollin. Fabrice Walfisch, who drove for Coloni and later Astromega, joined the European Touring Car Championship in 2001, and André Couto left the series to drive in a Japan-based series. Nordic Racing employed Tomáš Enge from MySap.com to replace the outgoing Kevin McGarrity.

Team Astromega changed their entire line-up. They signed the German Formula Three (GF3) champion Giorgio Pantano to drive his first season in the championship and the WRT driver Ananda Mikola joined him. Driver Fernando Alonso went to Formula One to join Minardi, and Marc Goossens left the team. DAMS also had a new line-up in its team. Franck Montagny switched to the World Series by Nissan and Kristian Kolby competed in the American Indy Lights. The 1997 Barber Dodge Pro Series champion Derek Hill and the Gauloises Formula racer Sébastien Bourdais replaced them. Antonio García graduated from the World Series by Nissan to join the Red Bull Junior Team to pair with GF3 driver Patrick Friesacher. He replaced Enrique Bernoldi, who moved to the Arrows Formula One team. Super Nova Racing signed Mark Webber from European Arrows and Mário Haberfeld from Fortec. European Minardi employed David Saelens from Super Nova, to partner Andrea Piccini, who left Kid Jensen Racing (KJR) after two seasons.

Nicolas Minassian left Super Nova and the series to join CART as teammate to Junqueira at CGR. KJR released Bas Leinders and he moved to KTR to partner Joël Camathias, who transferred from the World Series by Nissan. Financial concerns meant Jeffrey van Hooydonk was unable to secure a seat in the championship and he went to drive in Belcar; his compatriot Yves Olivier and Christijan Albers of European Arrows entered the Deutsche Tourenwagen Masters. Italian F3000 competitors Gabriele Varano and Nicolás Filiberti joined the championship by signing for the Prost Junior Team. KJR employed the Formula Palmer Audi driver Justin Keen and Yann Goudy from Italian F3000 to fill the seats vacated by Piccini and Leinders.

Mid-season driver changes

KJR replaced Yann Goudy with Gianluca Calcagni for the Autodromo Enzo e Dino Ferrari round. The team later withdrew from the championship before the Circuit de Catalunya event due to ownership problems and Calcagni driving for them in Imola, which created tension with the series' governing body. Shortly before the A1 Ring round, Ananda Mikola's sponsorship money did not arrive in time at Astromega and a poor performance resulted in Astromega replacing him with Dino Morelli for the next four events. Enrico Toccacelo later drove in Morelli's place for the rest of the season.

Stéphane Sarrazin made a one-off appearance for Prost at the Monaco round as a replacement for Filiberti, who was absent due to "personal issues". Prost later replaced the underperforming Filiberti with Zsolt Baumgartner for the rest of the year from the Nürburgring round and the French Formula Three champion and Porsche Supercup driver Jonathan Cochet drove Variano's car. Prost backed the initiative of one of its major sponsors to promote Latin American drivers in its team and the GF3 series winner Norberto Fontana was drafted in place of Cochet for the season's final three rounds. Before the Monaco round, Red Bull terminated García's contract, and they replaced him with Ricardo Maurício.

European Minardi was represented by the Formula Nippon racer and Jaguar test driver Tomas Scheckter in one of its cars for the Hockenheimring race after Saelens sustained an injury in an accident during the Silverstone event. Rodrigo Sperafico ended his campaign after the same event and was replaced at Coloni by Goossens for the rest of the season with new sponsorship brought to them.

Season calendar
A 12-race season calendar was released by the Fédération Internationale de l'Automobile (FIA; the series' governing body) at a meeting of the FIA World Motor Sport Council in Seville on 4 October 2000. All events were held in support on the Saturday of Formula One races. The series expanded from 10 to 12 races: a South American event to begin the season was at the Autódromo José Carlos Pace in Brazil for the series' first race to be held outside of Europe in the modern era. The season-ending round was held at Italy's Autodromo Nazionale di Monza.

Regulation and sporting changes

Technical changes

Cars were required to have their wheels attached to their primary structures by means of a single tether for each wheel to prevent them from becoming detached in case of an accident.

Sporting changes

Teams who finished 12th or higher in the 2000 International Formula 3000 Teams' Championship were granted automatic entry into the 2001 series. The final three slots were allocated to new entries or those who had won national Formula 3000 series. Had there been not enough entries via that process, the final three teams in the 2000 season received invitations to compete in the order they finished in the championship.

Season report

Pre-season

The first official pre-season test took place at the Autodromo Enzo e Dino Ferrari from 14 to 15 February 2001. The two days saw Wilson lap fastest at 1 minute, 37.850 seconds and he later damaged the rear of his car in a collision with a tyre wall. Fernando Alonso helped Minardi's Formula 3000 team with chassis setup and provided its two drivers with a performance benchmark. A second official pre-season test was held at the Silverstone Circuit between 12 and 13 March 2001. Bourdais led overall for DAMS with a 1 minute, 36.326 seconds lap in variable weather.

Opening rounds 

The season began in Brazil. Brazilian drivers took the first four positions in qualifying with Melo claiming pole position for the first time in his career from Ricardo Sperafico, Rodrigo Sperafico and Pizzonia. The stewards neutralised the race on lap one with the safety car to clear the track when Pizzonia swerved to avoid Ricardo Sperafico's vehicle; the latter swerved to avoid other competitors, causing him to spin and crash into the barrier at the bottom of the Senna S chicane. Melo slowed sharply and allowed Pizzonia, Rodrigo Sperafico and Enge to pass him under safety car conditions. At the lap four restart, Wilson overtook Melo into the first corner, and moved into first when Pizzonia, Rodrigo Sperafico and Enge each incurred ten-second stop-and-go penalties for their earlier transgressions. Wilson led the rest of the race to win in motor racing for the first time since the 1998 Formula Palmer Audi, and was the first British driver to win in International Formula 3000 since Jamie Davies won at the Autodromo di Pergusa in the 1997 season. He lost control of his car afterwards and avoided hitting the pit lane wall. Webber, the pre-season favourite, took second from Melo in third, who had engine problems. The stewards later imposed a 25-second time penalty on Webber for passing David Saelens before the start/finish line after the safety car entered the pit lane for the restart. He moved from second to seventh.

Webber took his first Formula 3000 pole position in qualifying for the Imola round by leading both sessions with Patrick Friesacher second and Darren Manning third. He led every lap of the race to take his first win of the season after he took painkillers to ease the effects of a broken rib. The victory drew him to within one point of Wilson. A crash for Varano after losing control on the kerbs on the exit of the Tamburello chicane caused him to become dizzy and prompted the safety car's deployment. In an accordion effect behind the safety car, Hill made contact with the rear of Calcagni's car, who had turned to the right to avoid hitting slower cars ahead of him. Both drivers avoided hitting marshals tending to Varano. Nordic locked out the front row for the first time at the following race in Spain with Wilson on pole position and his teammate Enge second. Enge passed Wilson at the start of the race at the first turn and maintained the lead throughout a processional round for his second Formula 3000 victory. Enge passed Webber for second in the drivers' championship and was one point behind his teammate Wilson. An error from Wilson allowed Bas Leinders to pass him for second.

The A1 Ring in Austria hosted the fourth round of the 2001 championship. Wet weather affected the second qualifying session and a lap from Sébastien Bourdais in the first session was fast enough to earn him the second pole position of his career. A first-lap collision between Bourdais and Friesacher at Castrol Kurve corner caused eight cars to retire and allowed Leinders to move into the lead, just as Wilson progressed to second. After a safety car period to clear the area, Wilson passed Leinders on the outside on the fifth lap and he held off the latter to win for the second time in International Formula 3000. The victory further extended Wilson's championship lead to seven points over his Nordic teammate Enge. During qualifying at Monaco Webber took a second pole position of 2001 despite crashing at the outside of La Rascasse turn late in the second session in a desire to better his lap. Webber held off Wilson at the start of the race and led every lap for his second victory of the year by eight-tenths of a second. Webber thus overtook Enge for second position in the drivers' championship. Two safety car periods for a first lap five-car accident at a hairpin and for separate crashes involving Darren Manning and Antônio Pizzonia slowed the race.

Mid-season

Heading into round six, Wilson led Webber in second by eleven points and was another two points in front of the third-placed Enge. Pole position for the Nürburgring event was taken by Enge after a duel with Webber and Ricardo Sperafico. Wilson was down in seventh place after he ran wide at a chicane. Enge was unchallenged throughout a noncompetitive race and achieved his second win of the season. The result moved Enge past Webber and into second position in the championship. He stood three points behind his teammate Wilson, who spun into a gravel trap and subsequently retired with a sheared peg on the front-left wheel. One week later at the Circuit de Nevers Magny-Cours in France, Enge carried his form over from the Nürburgring round to qualify on pole position for the second race in succession on his second lap of the session with no slower traffic to impede him. Webber, Patrick Friesacher and Wilson were in positions two to four. Webber overtook Enge at the first corner to take the lead and Wilson passed Freisacher for third position. Webber pulled away from the rest of the field to claim victory and drew to within one championship point of Wilson, who finished second after Enge ran wide at a hairpin on the final lap.

Enge took another pole position when he set the fastest lap, ahead of his teammate Wilson and Bourdais at the Silverstone round in the United Kingdom. A major airborne accident at Becketts corner involving Saelens in qualifying caused a long stoppage to allow for him to be extricated from his car with FIA doctor Sid Watkins supervising. Saelens was transported to Northampton General Hospital and was withdrawn from the race with ninth vertebrae and wrist ligament damage. In the race, the Nordic cars of Enge and Wilson collided at Stowe turn on the fourth lap. Wilson ran wide onto the gravel and this elevated Bourdais to second position. A brief rain shower on lap nineteen caused Enge to go onto the gravel at Copse corner and Bourdais took the lead. He held off Wilson to take his first Formula 3000 victory as Enge's engine cut out on the final lap and gave his compatriot Antônio Pizzonia third.

Final rounds

Ricardo Sperafico beat Wilson by 0.071 seconds to achieve the first pole position of his career in the next round at the Hockenheimring. Sperafico had excess wheelspin off the line; he kept the lead by blocking Wilson, who lost second place to his teammate Enge. Wilson and Pizzonia subsequently took first and second before the latter passed the former on lap three. Pizzonia lead the rest of the race to win for the first time in the series. A second-place result for Wilson and a non-finish for Webber after hitting the rear of Darren Manning's car increased his lead to ten points in the championship. The season resumed three weeks later at the Hungaroring in Hungary. Wilson emerged ahead of Webber in qualifying with pole position, and broke away from the start as Webber had less grip and fell behind Enge and Mauricio. Enge delayed Webber until he made an error at the final turn and the latter passed him. This resulted in contact between Enge and Webber and the latter was imposed a ten-second stop-and-go penalty dropping him to eleventh. With four laps remaining, Webber beached his car upon a kerb and promoted Bourdais to third. Wilson took his third career victory with a margin of 5 seconds over Mauricio. He extended his championship lead over Webber to 20 points and Nordic won the Teams' Championship with two races to go.

Going into the Spa-Francorchamps round, Webber needed to win the final two races and for Wilson not to score any points to win the drivers' championship on countback with more race victories. Wilson required a sixth-place result in either race to secure the title regardless of where Webber finished. Petrobras took the first two positions in qualifying with Ricardo Sperafico on pole position and his teammate Antônio Pizzonia second. Wilson and Webber could only manage third and fifth respectively. The race began in inclement weather and the safety car was used for two laps to allow competitors to familiarise themselves with the wet track. An accident for Webber at Eau Rouge corner early on saw his car destroyed and him taken to a hospital in Verviers for a precautionary x-ray scan that discovered knee ligament damage and no fractured bones. Wilson finished second to clinch the drivers' title with one race remaining as Sperafico led every lap of the event to achieve his first career win. Wilson was the first British driver in history to win the International Formula 3000 Championship.

At the season-ending Autodromo Nationale di Monza race, a deluge caused localised flooding and strong winds blowing natural debris onto the circuit forced the postponement of qualifying. Qualifying was reformatted as a solitary 20-minute session on Saturday afternoon and the race began half an hour later than scheduled. Pizzonia qualified on pole position for the first time in his career and he was joined on the grid's front row by Wilson in second. The start was aborted twice and delayed for 23 minutes because several drivers stalled their cars on the grid. Pantano emerged a Formula 3000 race winner for the first time in his career after he overcame being put onto the grass by Pizzonia at the start, a manoeuvre which entailed a ten-second stop-and-go penalty for the latter. Wilson went on to finish second and Ricardo Sperafico placed third.

Wilson finished on 71 points with Webber and Enge tied for second position with 39 points each. He eclipsed the record of Juan Pablo Montoya from the 1998 season with the most points accumulated in an International Formula 3000 season, which he kept until Björn Wirdheim improved on it en route to winning the 2003 championship.

Results and standings

Points system

Points were awarded to the top six classified finishers in every race, using the following structure:

Drivers' Championship

 Driver did not finish the Race but was classified as he completed over 90% of the race distance.

Teams' Championship

See also
 2001 Euro Formula 3000 season

References

External links
 2001 Race Results Retrieved from www.teamdan.com on 7 September 2009

International Formula 3000
International Formula 3000 seasons
Formula 3000